This is a list of notable companies and people of the Cambodian film and entertainment industry.

Companies

Founded in the 1960s 

 TVK (Khmer) (since 1966), Cambodia's original broadcasting station; broadcast in black and white until 1986

Founded in the 1970s 

 Pisnoka (1970-1975), owned by actor Vann Vannak, and all films of which he plays the leading male role
 Sovann Kiri (1972-1984), a now-defunct Khmer-Thai joint film company owned by movie stars Dy Saveth and Hui Keung; ran in Cambodia 1972-1975; ran in Hong Kong 1975-1984

Film and entertainment companies founded after the fall of the Khmer Rouge in 1979 include:

Founded in the 1980s 

 CM (international film) (since 1985), owned by Sem Sovandeth

Founded in the 1990s

 Angkorwat films (since 1990), owned by Yvette Som
 Reksmey Hang Meas (since 1990)
 SM (since 1990), owned by Mai Sameth

Founded in the 2000s

 Khmer Entertainment Inc. (since 2005), CEO Lim Cheang; an entertainment promotion company targeting Cambodian Americans; sponsors high-profile singers in Cambodia and holds large scale performances in various US cities
 Khmer Mekong Films (since 2006); a film and television production company based in Phnom Penh, the capital of Cambodia

People
Notable Cambodian film producers and directors include:

 Fey Som Ang (1989–present), Cambodian film director; also associated with Thai film productions
 Parn Puong Bopha (1989–present), Cambodian film director
 Kong Buncheun, novelist; music composer, producer, and director since the 1950s
 Tea Lum Kang, Chinese-Cambodian film director of the 1970s; directed the Cambodian film Pos Keng Kang
 Huy Kung, Chinese-Cambodian film director of the 1970s and 80s
 Brendan Moriarty (2003-present), American-Cambodian director and producer
 Rithy Panh (1988–present), French-trained Cambodian producer
 Ieu Pannakar (b. 1931 – d. 2018), film director from the 1950s
 Channy Peakdey, film director since 1989; directed the 1994 version of Promatt Promong
 Tim Pek (1975–present), Australian-Cambodia film director and producer
 Matthew Robinson, British-Cambodian founder of Khmer Mekong Films
 Dy Saveth, film producer and actress from the 1970s; also associated with Thai film productions
 King Norodom Sihanouk, former king; directed more than 46 Khmer films, 43 of which were produced after his abdication in 1955
 Yvette Som (1990–present), producer of Angkorwat studio films
 Mao Somnang, Cambodian novelist and screenwriter of the 1980s and 90s
 Tat Somnang, Cambodian, singer, producer, and film director of the 1970s
 Vann Vannak, film director and actor from the 1970s

References

Cinema of Cambodia
Entertainment
Khmer